Jeffrey W. Burkett is a retired United States Air Force major general who served as the deputy director of the Joint Force Development and Design Center of the Joint Staff from November 2019 to December 2021. Previously, he was the vice director of domestic operations of the National Guard Bureau.

References

Living people
Place of birth missing (living people)
Recipients of the Defense Superior Service Medal
Recipients of the Legion of Merit
United States Air Force generals
United States Air Force personnel of the War in Afghanistan (2001–2021)
Year of birth missing (living people)